is a common masculine Japanese given name.

Possible writings
Hideki can be written using different kanji characters and can mean:
秀樹, "excellence", "timber trees"
英樹, "superior", "timber trees"
英機, "superior", "chance"
秀喜, "excellence", "pleasure"
秀紀, "excellence", "chronicle"
英輝, "superior", "brightness"
英希, "superior", "hope"
The name can also be written in hiragana or katakana.

People with the name
Notable people with the name include:

 Hideki Abe (安倍 栄基), Japanese video game composer
 Hideki Arai (新井 英樹, born 1963), Japanese manga artist
 Hideki Fujii (藤井 秀樹, born 1934), Japanese photographer
 Hideki Fujisawa (藤沢 秀樹, born 1963), also known as Dance☆Man, Japanese musician
, Japanese basketball player
, Japanese professional wrestler
 Hideki Imai (今井 秀樹, born 1943), Japanese information theorist and cryptographer
 Hideki Imamura (born January 29, 1972), Japanese musician, co-founder and vocalist of the band Siam Shade
 Hideki Irabu (伊良部 秀輝, 1969-2011), a Japanese professional baseball player who played in both Japan and the United States
, Japanese footballer
 Hideki Isoda (磯田秀樹, born 1970), Japanese producer, director, and composer
 Hideki Kadowaki (門脇英基, born 1976), Japanese mixed martial artist
 Hideki Kamiya (神谷 英樹), Japanese video game designer
 Hideki Kita (喜多 秀喜, born 1952), retired Japanese long-distance runner
 Hideki Kojima (小島 英樹), Japanese voice actor
 Hideki Komatsu (小松英樹, born 1967), Japanese Go player
 Hideki Makihara (牧原 秀樹, born 1971), Japanese politician
 Hideki Matsui (松井 秀喜, born 1974), Japanese baseball player
 Hideki Matsutake (born 1951), Japanese electronic musician
 Hideki Matsuoka (松岡秀樹, born 1968), Japanese Go player
 Hideki Matsuyama (born 1992), Japanese golfer
, Japanese Nordic combined skier
Hideki Murai (born 1980), Japanese politician
 Hideki Mutoh (武藤 英紀, born 1982), Japanese race car driver
 Hideki Naganuma (長沼 英樹, born 1972), Japanese video game music composer and Twitter shitposter
, Japanese Nordic combined skier
, Japanese rugby union player
 Hideki Niwa (丹羽 秀樹, born 1972), Japanese politician
 Hideki Niizuma (born 1970), Japanese politician
, Japanese racing driver
, Japanese actor, playwright and theatre director
 Hideki Okajima (岡島 秀樹, born 1974), Japanese baseball player
 Hideki Saijo (西城 秀樹, 1955-2018), Japanese singer and television celebrity
 Hideki Shirakawa (白川 英樹, born 1936), Japanese chemist and winner of the 2000 Nobel Prize in Chemistry
, Japanese baseball player
 Hideki Takahashi (高橋 英樹, born 1944), Japanese actor
 Hideki Tasaka (田坂 秀樹, born 1975), Japanese voice actor
, Japanese boxer
 Hideki Tojo (東條 英機, 1884-1948), Japanese Prime Minister during World War II
 Hideki Yukawa (湯川 秀樹, 1907-1981), Japanese theoretical physicist and the first Japanese Nobel laureate
, Japanese sumo wrestler

Fictional characters
 Hideki Motosuwa (本須和秀樹), a character in the manga series Chobits
 Hideki, a character in the anime series Devil Hunter Yohko
 Hideki Go, the alter ego of Ultraman Jack from the 1971 tokusatsu film The Return of Ultraman
 Ryūga Hideki (流河 旱樹), an alias for L from the manga Death Note
 Hideki Nishimura, a character in the light novel series And You Thought There Is Never a Girl Online?

 Hideki Alessandro De Blasiis Novikov, one of the main characters from The World is Truly a Beautiful Place, Captain Kiyoshi!

Japanese masculine given names